From the Land of Volcanos  is the debut solo album by Drill and KMFDM veteran Lucia Cifarelli.

Releases
The Control Group CGO 014 - CD

Track listing
"So Clever" - 3:59
"I Don't Care" - 3:58
"Northern Star" - 4:06
"Fear" - 4:53
"Feels Like Summer" - 4:29
"What You Become" - 4:04
"We Are Angels" - 4:06
"Who Asked You" - 4:52
"I Will" - 4:26
"Monkey Puzzle Tree" - 3:49
"Little Rose" - 4:02
"Ordinary Girl" - 4:22
"Monkey Puzzle Tree" (KMFDM version) - 3:10

Total playing time: 54:16

Personnel

Jim Barton – production (9), recording (9), mixing (9), engineering (9)
Dave Bascombe – mixing (3, 7)
Dave Bassett – Writing (1)
Eric Bazilian – Co-production (7), recording (7), guitars (7), drums (7), bass (7)
Lucia Cifarelli – writing, vocals, backing vocals
Maren Costa – design
Charles Van Devender – acoustic guitar (9)
Marc Fox – percussion (1, 3–5)
Wally Gagel – writing (5), programming (5)
Kevin Gallagher – recording (10–12)
Toni Gillis – mastering (at The Hit Factory, NYC)
Martin Green – arrangement (4)
Reg Gwynedd – bass (1, 2)
Simon Hanson – drums (10, 12)
Dan Harnett – writing (2, 9), guitars (9)
Matt Hay – programming (1-8, 10-12)
Jules Hodgson – guitars (13)
Clare Kenny – bass (3–5)
Jon Klein – writing (10), guitars (1, 2, 10-12)
Sascha Konietzko – writing (6, 8, 11, 12), co-production (6, 8, 11, 12), guitars (6, 11), percussion (6, 11), bass (6, 8, 11), drums (8, 11), synthesizer (13), programming (6, 8, 11, 12), additional drum loops (9)
Eric Kupper – writing (9)
Julian Leaper – violins (4)
Patrick Leonard – writing (3, 4)
Devan McClure – hair
Heidi Nymark – makeup
PCA Photography – photography
William "Bill" Rieflin – writing (8), bass (12)
Chuck Sabo – drums (1-4, 6, 7)
Andy Selway – drums (13)
Julie Simon – writing (7), backing vocals (7)
Brian Sperber – mixing (5)
Ian Stanley – production (1-8, 10-12), recording (1-8, 10-12), keyboards, programming (1-8, 10-12)
Neil Taylor – guitars (1-5, 8)
Mark Taylor – piano (4)
Patrick Thrasher – engineering (9), additional drum loops (9)
Cenzo Townshend – recording (1-6, 8), mixing (1, 2, 4, 6, 8, 10-12)
Brent Zius – project coordinator

References

2003 debut albums